Bargain Buddy is an Adware program developed by Exact Advertising. Bargain Buddy software monitors Internet usage and displays advertisements based on the websites a user views. The software may also display ads for Exact Advertising programs such as FunGameDownloads and PhotoGizmo.

Method of infection and variants 
The program is downloaded as a Browser Helper Object (BHO) as part of software bundles via the Internet, through free downloads such as games, wallpapers and screensavers. Bargain Buddy may also be known as CashBackBuddy, Bullseye Software, eXact Searchbar and NaviSearch.

Affected operating systems
Bargain Buddy is only known to infect computers running the Microsoft Windows Operating System, specifically integrating with the Internet Explorer web browser. The following Windows systems may be infected:

 Windows 2000
 Windows 95
 Windows 98
 Windows Me
 Windows NT 4.0
 Windows Server 2003
 Windows XP

Symptoms of infection 
In a typical installation, the following files are created: bbchk.exe & bargains.exe. The Registry is also modified so the software runs at system startup.

Removal 
Exact Advertising insists that users should only attempt to remove Bargain Buddy and other Exact Advertising products through the Add/Remove programs applet, in the Control Panel. Symantec has released a tool to help remove the program. It may also be removed by PC Tools Spyware Doctor, the Norton Family of Security products, and Spybot Search & Destroy.

See also 
 Rogue software
 Adware

References

External links 
 Symantec Bargain Buddy Removal Tool

Rogue software
Adware